Rhysium is a genus of beetles in the family Cerambycidae, containing the following species:

 Rhysium bimaculatum Pascoe, 1866
 Rhysium bivulneratum (Thomson, 1867)
 Rhysium guttiferum (Thomson, 1867)
 Rhysium spilotum Martins & Galileo, 2007

References

Cerambycidae genera
Ibidionini